Gavin Singh (born 15 December 1987) is a Surinamese cricketer from Guyana. He played in the 2015 ICC World Cricket League Division Six tournament, which Suriname won, with Singh named player of the series. Suriname were promoted to 2016 ICC World Cricket League Division Five, but later withdrew due to an ICC investigation about the eligibility of some of the players, with Singh being named as one of them.

References

External links
 

1987 births
Living people
Surinamese cricketers
Sportspeople from Georgetown, Guyana
Guyanese emigrants to Suriname